Douglas Savoy Thomas (September 18, 1969 – December 19, 2014) was an American football wide receiver in the National Football League (NFL) who played for the Seattle Seahawks. He played college football for the Clemson Tigers.

He died in 2014.

References

1969 births
2014 deaths
American football wide receivers
Seattle Seahawks players
Clemson Tigers football players
People from Rockingham, North Carolina
Players of American football from North Carolina